Leslie William Morrison (born 29 December 1940), known professionally as Lucky Starr, is an Australian pioneer rock and roll, pop and country music singer, guitarist and television presenter. His most popular single, "I've Been Everywhere", appeared in early 1962, which peaked at number one in Sydney. Starr became well known through his many TV appearances on show's such as Bandstand and Six O'Clock Rock, in which he briefly hosted taking over from Johnny O'Keefe, he was the first star to entertain troops in Vietnam.

Biography

Early life
Lucky Starr was born as Leslie William Morrison in 1940. His father was a motor mechanic and his mother was a housewife, and he had a younger sister and an adopted older sister (who was his cousin but adopted into the family when her parents passed away). He attended Canterbury High School before starting an apprenticeship as an electrician.

The Hepparays
Two-and-a-half years later he began his rock and roll career in 1957 as Les Starr, lead singer and rhythm guitarist, of the Hepparays in Sydney. Other members were Tony Caperero on lead guitar, Bruce Gurr on piano, Dave Taylor played bass guitar and Owen Smith provided drums and percussion. Starr recalled how, "the guitarist in his band taught him [how to play] in five months." After winning several talent quests, "someone idly punned that he was 'a lucky Starr'."

Late in 1959, as Lucky Starr, he signed as a solo artist to Festival Records, and in December he released a four-track extended play, Sentimental Journey. For his early work he used the Hepparays as his backing band. He followed with four singles in the next year.

Television performing  and presenting
He was a regular performer on television music and variety shows, Bandstand and Six O'Clock Rock, and took over from Johnny O'Keefe as host of the latter for a brief period in 1960, while O'Keefe was touring the United States.

Controversy
In May 1960 Morrison, aged 19, was involved in a romance with touring Mouseketeer, Cheryl Holdridge, who was under 16. In May 1963 he recalled, "We corresponded when she went back to the States, and I decided then to follow her, somehow. Once, in 1961, I waited up all night to phone her when she was recovering from a tonsils operation. But we are not 'in love' any more, I guess."

Albums and singles
Starr released his cover version of the novelty, tongue-twisting single, "I've Been Everywhere", in early 1962, it was written by Geoff Mack, which name-drops numerous Australian towns. It peaked at number one in Sydney in April. "Spinner" from The Biz described the track, "It's a hard hitting novelty number with a slight C and W flavour. Full of gimmicks it features high velocity lyrics in which Lucky recites 120 towns in the Commonwealth... [He] sings each verse in one breath and you'll wonder how he does it when you hear it." Adapted to American towns, it became a United States country music hit for Hank Snow after being released in September of that year.

Starr released a compilation album, I've Been Everywhere, in June 1962, which included his early singles and their B-sides. "Spinner" opined, "[it shows his] versatility to the foil, which is evident in the tracks, 'Candy Pink Lips,' 'Suspense' and "Sweet Georgia Brown.' Other tracks include: 'Heart-Break,' 'Way Down Yonder in New Orleans,' 'I See You as an Angel' and others. In our opinion this LP is worthy of a place in the libraries of both young and the young at heart alike — it's a beauty." According to the journalist, "[he] has worked at his profession perfecting his musicianship, taking voice training, learning acting and dancing — in a word, learning enough to make the most of his 'break' when it came." In July of that year he issued a four-track EP, Lucky's Been Everywhere, with his four versions of "I've Been Everywhere": the Australian one, the US one, the British one and a newly-written New Zealand one.

Touring the US
During 1963 he travelled to the US where "[he] played the Nevada circuit, opening in mid-1963 at the Mapes Hotel Casino Room, Las Vegas." According to The Australian Women's Weeklys Robin Adair the tour was organised by US entertainer, Norman Kaye (of the Mary Kaye Trio). Starr signed with local label, Dot Records, which released a lone single, "Poor Little Jimmy Brown", however "proposed American movie roles and major record deals never happened." He returned late that year to Australia and appeared in Once Upon a Surfie, a Christmas-themed surfing musical alongside "Dig Richards, Jackie Weaver, Bryan Davies, Jay Justin, Rob EG, Jan Green and The Delltones."

Starr issued another solo album, The Silver Spade Digs Lucky, in 1964. He subsequently toured "the USA, New Zealand, the Philippines, Hong Kong, Malaysia, Taiwan, Japan, Vietnam and Italy." According to Daily Mercurys correspondent, "[he was] the first Australian performer to entertain the troops in Vietnam; in fact paying his own way there and made five subsequent trips into the war zone." During the late 1960s Starr performed as a country musician "and took his travelling show around the Australian bush." In 1980 he was inducted into the Australian Country Music Hall of Fame with their Hands of Fame.

Currently
In September 2015 Starr released a re-working of "I've Been Everywhere" titled, "We're Going Everywhere... On the Old Hume Highway". He has two children and a grandchild.  he was still performing regularly.

Discography

Albums
 I've Been Everywhere (June 1962) Festival Records (FL 30807)
 The Silver Spade Digs Lucky (1964) Festival Records

Extended plays
 Sentimental Journey (December 1959) Festival Records
 Lucky's Been Everywhere (July 1962) Festival Records

Singles
 "Somebody Touched Me" (January 1960)
 "The Big Hurt" (March 1960)
 "Wrong" (May 1960) Sydney charts: No. 40
 "Yeah That's How (Rock'n'Roll was Born)" (September 1960) Sydney charts: No. 31
 "Someone Else's Roses" (March 1961) Sydney charts: No. 37
 "I've Been Everywhere" (early 1962) Sydney charts: No. 1
 "June in Junee" (1962)
 "Hot Rod" (1962)
 "Mule Skinner Blues" (1963)
 "Come on In" (1963)
 "Poor Little Jimmy Brown" (1964)

Awards

Mo Awards
The Australian Entertainment Mo Awards (commonly known informally as the Mo Awards), were annual Australian entertainment industry awards. They recognise achievements in live entertainment in Australia from 1975 to 2016.
 (wins only)
|-
| 2008
| Lucky Starr
| Hall of Fame
| 
|-

References

General
  Note: Archived [on-line] copy has limited functionality.
  Note: [on-line] version established at White Room Electronic Publishing Pty Ltd in 2007 and was expanded from the 2002 edition.
Specific

External links
"Portrait of Lucky Starr, 1969 [picture]" by Em McQuillan. Held at National Library of Australia.

1940 births
Australian male singers
Australian television presenters
Living people